The men's 5000 metres event at the 2014 Asian Games was held at the Incheon Asiad Main Stadium, Incheon, South Korea on 27 September.

Schedule
All times are Korea Standard Time (UTC+09:00)

Records

Results

References

External links
Results

5000 metres men
2014